Damascus Community School is an unlicensed American school founded by the former US secretary of state John Foster Dulles in 1957 in Damascus, Syria. The school was built to promote American ideals and culture and to help steer Syria away from becoming a Soviet satellite. Since 2012, due to the situation in Syria, the school has been effectively shut down.

Mission
The Damascus Community School laid its foundation with the help of Syria's former foreign minister Salah al-Bitar, who was one of the co-founders of the Baath party. After much controversy between the school and the Syrian government, Damascus Community School, was finally able to obtain full license from the government. However, throughout the decades the school has seen itself become part of a political tug-of-war between the Syrian and American government whenever the relations of the two countries become sour. The school is credited with introducing Valentine’s Day to Syria, as well as many other Universal holidays. Annual tuition reaches to about US$17,000. Current enrollment is about 400 students.

After an American raid into Syrian territory on October 26, 2008, the Syrian government decided to shut down the Damascus Community School in light of the violation of Syrian international borders and the absence of any official American explanation for the helicopter raid that killed 8 Syrian civilians.

However, DCS Board of Directors voted to reopen Damascus Community School for 2010–2011 school year, grades PreK–8. Dr. James Leibzeit returned as a director. Following the 2011 unrest in Syria the school was shut down on January 22, 2012, and until further notice.

In accordance with the Damascus Community School’s August 31, 2008, license and with previous enrollment procedures, Damascus Community School will enroll foreign students, Syrian students and students with dual Syrian-other nationality who have previously attended the school. Other Syrian students or Syrian students holding dual nationality who wish to enroll at the school will need to contact the Ministry of Education for approval before they are capable to register, as was the previous practice prior to the school’s closure in November 2008.

References

External links

 Damascus Community School Official site (Archive)

Schools in Damascus
International schools in Syria
1957 establishments in Syria
Educational institutions established in 1957